Alon Harazi (born February 13, 1971) is a retired Israeli footballer and currently the Israel youth team assistant manager. Harazi finished his career during the season of 2009/2010 as captain and the most veteran player at Maccabi Haifa. He came to the club in 1990 at the age of 18 from a third Division team. Began as a striker in Hakoah Ramat Gan youth teams and in there senior squad but at his late career played in defensive roles, mostly as a central defender or right back.

Harazi has made 89 international appearances for Israel and won 9 league championships, more than any other Israeli player – 8 of those championships were with Maccabi Haifa (1 more was with Beitar Jerusalem) as well as three State Cup titles. Harazi have made 400 league appearances with Maccabi Haifa - a team record, which was celebrated during November 2005 league match versus Maccabi Tel Aviv but continued and put a higher record on the number of 498  Performances only with Maccabi Haifa 
Harazi play one More season with Beitar Jerusalem and Brock the Israeli league Performances on the number of 524

Harazi was the fastest player in Israel , had an excellent header, with an outstanding understanding of the game. Appeared with Maccabi Haifa 2 times in the UEFA Champions League group stage.

His grandfather played football for Makkabi Judah in Poland.

On June 3, 2009, it was announced that Harazi decided to retire from professional soccer and will play his last game in the summer of 2009, in the UEFA Champion's League qualifying round with Maccabi Haifa.

On December 8, 2009, Harazi officially retired from the game against Bordeaux in the last game of the UEFA Champions League group stage.

Honours
Israeli Premier League (9):
1990-91, 1993–94, 1997–98, 2000–01, 2001–02, 2003–04, 2004–05, 2005–06, 2008–09
Israel State Cup (3):
1991, 1993, 1995
Toto Cup (5):
1993-94, 1997–98, 2001–02, 2005–06, 2007–08

References

1971 births
Living people
Israeli footballers
Israel international footballers
Footballers from Ramat Gan
Maccabi Haifa F.C. players
Beitar Jerusalem F.C. players
Hakoah Maccabi Ramat Gan F.C. players
Israeli people of Yemeni-Jewish descent
Israeli Premier League players
Hapoel Acre F.C. managers
Israeli Premier League managers
Association football defenders
Israeli football managers